Telephone numbers in the Cocos Islands use ranges owned by Australia.

Country Code: +61 8 9162 (partial)
International Call Prefix: 0011
Trunk Prefix: 0

Format +61 8 9162 XXXX

Cocos Island numbers formerly used the +672 country code until 1994, when they were migrated to +61.

References

Cocos Islands
Cocos (Keeling) Islands